Palak Kour Bijral (born ) is an Indian individual rhythmic gymnast. She represents her nation at international competitions. She competed at world championships, including at the 2013 World Rhythmic Gymnastics Championships. In 2014 she competed at the 2014 Commonwealth Games.

Career

Junior (2003-2012) 
Her father introduced her to gymnastics when she was five to improve her posture, flexibility, and body shape.  Bijral trained 6–8 hours a day; a typical schedule included an early get up, then choreography and practice. An open practice at the gym until 2 p.m. and a second practice in afternoon lasting until 9 p.m.

She made her international debut competing on the novice level at the 2008 at 4th Children Of Asia International Games, Russia

Senior (International)

2013 season (World Championships)

2014 season (Commonwealth Games)

2015 season (National Games)

2017 season (National championship)

2018 season (National Champion of India,Thailand open international championship)

2019 season (Emirates International cup)

Awards 
Sher-i-Kashmir Sports Award in 2006.
State Award 2014–15.
All Round Best Award from His Excellency President of India Sh. R. N. Kovind in 2018.

References

External links
 Palak Kour Bijral  on Instagram
 Palak Kour Bijral on Twitter
 Palak Kour Bijral on Wordpress Blogs

1996 births
Living people
People from Jammu (city)
Indian rhythmic gymnasts
Place of birth missing (living people)
Gymnasts at the 2014 Commonwealth Games
Commonwealth Games competitors for India